Margaret "Wiffi" Smith (born September 28, 1936) is an American professional golfer who played on the LPGA Tour.

Smith was born in Redlands, California. She moved to Mexico when she was 11 years old and learned to play golf there. She won several amateur events including the 1954 U.S. Girls' Junior and the 1956 British Ladies Amateur. She played on the 1956 Curtis Cup team.

She turned professional in 1957 and joined the LPGA Tour. She won eight times on the Tour between 1957 and 1960.

Amateur wins
this list may be incomplete
1952 Women's Championship of Mexico
1954 U.S. Girls' Junior
1955 World Women's Amateur, North and South Women's Amateur
1956 British Ladies Amateur, French Women's Amateur, Trans-Mississippi Amateur

LPGA Tour wins (8)
1957 (2) Dallas Open, United Voluntary Services Open
1958 (1) Peach Blossom Open
1959 (2) MAGA Pro-Am, Betsy Rawls Open
1960 (3) Royal Crown Open, Betsy Rawls Peach Blossom Open, Waterloo Open

Team appearances
Amateur
Curtis Cup (representing the United States): 1956

References

American female golfers
Winners of ladies' major amateur golf championships
LPGA Tour golfers
Golfers from California
People from Redlands, California
1936 births
Living people
21st-century American women